Ahmed bin Fahd Al Saud (born 9 September 1986) is a member of Saudi royal family. He is the deputy governor of Eastern province of Saudi Arabia.

Early life and education
Prince Ahmed was born on 9 September 1986. His father is late Fahd bin Salman bin Abdulaziz Al Saud; the eldest son of King Salman. His mother is Nouf bint Khalid ibn Abdullah who died on 20 July 2021. Ahmed bin Fahd has one brother, Sultan, and two sisters, Sara and Reema.

His mother's family controls Mawarid Holding, which owns OSN, one of the largest satellite television providers in the Middle East, and American Express Middle East.

Ahmed bin Fahd received his primary education at the Dhahran schools in the Eastern provinces. He attended Najd schools in Al Riyadh and then, Al Riyadh schools in 2003. He earned a bachelor's degree in law from the King Saud University in 2007. Also, he also undertook specialized courses in the fields of research, assets administration, brokerage and investment banking from the Jadwa Investment Corporation.

Career
In 2014 Ahmed in Fahd worked at the department of political affairs in the Saudi embassy in London.

In April 2017, he was appointed deputy governor of the Eastern Province, Saudi Arabia, home to the world's largest onshore oil field. Abqaiq, the world's largest oil processing plant, the Ghawar oilfield, and the kingdom's Shiite minority are all located in the Eastern Province.

Personal life
Ahmed bin Fahd is married to Salma bint Badr bin Abdul Mohsen Al Saud. They married on 9 December 2014 and have a daughter, Nouf (born July 2019).

Ahmed bin Fahd has many charitable concerns and humanitarian contributions. He is a member of many charitable associations and organizations, including:
 Honorary member of the disabled kids association in Riyadh.
 A member in the development committee of the charitable organization for orphans care (Insan).
 He joined the board of directors of the charitable organization for orphans care (Insan) on (13 April 2013).

References

Ahmed
1986 births
Ahmed
King Saud University alumni
Living people